Rajesh Chada, known as Raj Chada, is a lawyer and Labour politician in England. He was the Leader of Camden London Borough Council from 2005 to 2006 and a councillor for Gospel Oak between 2002 and 2006.

He is a top criminal solicitor specialising in defending protesters and he is regularly quoted in the national press. He has been covered in major newspapers for defending 300 Extinction Rebellion activists, the Stansted Fifteen, nine Black Lives Matter protesters at Heathrow, protesters at DSEI, UK Uncut's sit-in in Fortnum and Masons, and Johnny Marbles. He is described by Chambers and Partners as having "a strong reputation for his work representing political protesters and other individuals charged with public order offences" and was named the Legal Aid Practitioners Criminal Lawyer of the Year in 2012.

Chada is a Labour Party politician. He was elected to Camden Council in 2002, representing Gospel Oak ward. He quickly joined the Cabinet with responsibility for Housing, before becoming the Leader of the council in 2005, replacing Jane Roberts after she stepped down due to fear that she would lose the coming election (which Labour did). He was considered less 'Blairite' than Roberts, but lost his seat in 2006 to the Conservatives because of association with Blair post-Iraq War and delays in housing improvements. Chada stood for selection in a number of parliamentary seats without success, including Darlington and  Reading West in 2010 and his home seat of Holborn and St Pancras in 2015.

References 

Leaders of local authorities of England
Councillors in the London Borough of Camden
Labour Party (UK) councillors
English solicitors
Living people
Year of birth missing (living people)
British politicians of Indian descent